The 4310th Air Division is a discontinued United States Air Force organization.  It was last assigned to the Sixteenth Air Force at Nouasseur Air Base, Morocco.   It was discontinued on 15 August 1963.

History
The 4310th Air Division was organized on 15 January 1958 by absorbing the mission, personnel and equipment of the 5th Air Division, which had been managing deployed Strategic Air Command (SAC) forces in Morocco since 1954.  The 5th was inactivated the same day that the 4310th was organized.

"The 4310th supervised the Strategic Air Command's Reflex forces in Morocco. The Reflex force concept involved deploying Boeing B-47 Stratojet medium bombardment aircraft non-stop from the United States to forward sites, with one air refueling. These aircraft remained on alert status for a specified number of days, then redeployed back to the United States.  The division commander also acted as a representative to the Moroccan Liaison office for the Commander, Sixteenth Air Force."

The division never had any assigned units, such as wings, only individual aircraft that were assigned to wings back in the United States.

The division was discontinued in August 1963 as part of SAC's closure of its Morocco bases.

Lineage
 Established as 4310 Air Division and organized on 15 January 1958
 Discontinued on 15 August 1963

Assignments
 Sixteenth Air Force, 15 January 1958 – 15 August 1963

Stations
 Sidi Slimane Air Base, Morocco, 15 January 1958
 Nouasseur Air Base, Morocco, 15 June 1958 – 15 August 1963

Commanders
 Brig Gen Keith K. Compton, 15 Jan 1958
 Maj Gen William E. Eubank, by 15 Oct 1958
 Maj Gen Horace M. Wade, 23 Jul 1959
 Brig Gen Robert B. Miller, 5 Aug 1961-15 Aug 1963

See also
 List of United States Air Force air divisions

References

Notes

Bibliography

 

Military units and formations established in 1958
Military units and formations disestablished in 1963
Units and formations of Strategic Air Command
Air 4310
1958 establishments in Morocco
1963 disestablishments in Morocco